Soaring is an album by trumpeter Don Ellis recorded in 1973 and released on the MPS label. The album features Hank Levy's composition which provided the title for, and was featured in, the 2014 film Whiplash.

Reception

Scott Yanow of Allmusic called it an "underrated set ...well worth searching for". On Jazz History Online, Michael Verity observed "By 1973, when he recorded Soaring, a 10-cut musical haiku, all of his interests were converging into a style that was bold, intensely rhythmic and perfectly calibrated sound for the big screen. (It should be no surprise he was scoring The French Connection at same time he was working on this project)."

Track listing 
All compositions by Don Ellis except as indicated
 "Whiplash" (Hank Levy) – 4:25
 "Sladka Pitka" (Milcho Leviev) – 6:40
 "The Devil Made Me Write This Piece" – 6:00
 "Go Back Home" (Sam Falzone) – 3:15
 "Invincible" – 6:43
 "Image of Maria" – 3:03
 "Sidonie" (Alexej Fried) – 6:37
 "Nicole" – 5:29

Personnel 
Don Ellis – trumpet, flugelhorn, drums, arranger
Fred Selden – alto saxophone, flute,  soprano saxophone, piccolo, alto flute 
Vince Denham – alto saxophone, tenor saxophone, soprano saxophone, flute, piccolo
Sam Falzone – tenor saxophone, clarinet, flute, arranger
Gary Herbig – baritone saxophone, soprano saxophone, clarinet, flute, oboe
Jack Caudill, Bruce Mackay, Gil Rathel – trumpet, flugelhorn
Sidney Muldrow – French horn
Mike Jamieson – trombone
Ken Sawhill – bass trombone
Doug Bixby – tuba
Jay Graydon – guitar, bag
Milcho Leviev – piano, electric piano, organ, clavinet, arranger
Dave McDaniel – bass
Ralph Humphrey – drums
Ron Dunn – drums, percussion
Lee Pastora – congas
Earle Corry, Joel Quivey – electric violin
Renita Koven – electric viola
Pat Kudzia – electric cello
Alexej Fried, Hank Levy – arranger

References 

Don Ellis albums
1973 albums
MPS Records albums